Sara Naeini (Shiraz, Iran) Iranian singer and songwriter.

Biography 
Sara Naeini was born on July 23, 1981 in Shiraz. She has experience working with singers like Alireza Assar, Mohammad Esfahani and Homayun Shajarian.

She inherited her musical abilities from her mother, who was also an Iranian singer and songwriter. She has had her first concert in 1999. Sara Naini currently teaches music. She has received a bachelor's degree in graphics from Sharia Technical College for girls in Tehran. Being a sports gymnastics champion among Iranian women, she was forced to stop her gymnastics activities due to damage to her spine after falling from the.

The singer's concerts soon attract the attention of society and the media. Then the Ministry of Culture and Islamic Guidance of Iran forbids her to practice singing. Not getting a singer's license, Sara decides to leave Iran.

References

1981 births
Living people
Iranian singer-songwriters
Iranian women singers
People from Shiraz